José Chandri (born 12 May 1947) is a Puerto Rican judoka. He competed in the men's heavyweight event at the 1976 Summer Olympics.

References

1947 births
Living people
Puerto Rican male judoka
Olympic judoka of Puerto Rico
Judoka at the 1976 Summer Olympics
Place of birth missing (living people)